Rui Fernando da Silva Rio  (born 6 August 1957) is a Portuguese economist and politician of the Social Democratic Party (PSD). He was the Mayor of Porto from 2002 to 2013. Between 2018 and 2022, he was President of the PSD and Leader of the Opposition.

Education
Rio studied at the Colégio Alemão do Porto (the German School of Porto), and earned his degree in economics at the University of Porto, where he was president of the Student Association, at the time the only Student Association that was not led by members of the Communist Party, and a member of the Pedagogical Council.

Professional career 
As an economist, he began his professional life in the textile industry, having, after completing his military service, also worked in the metalmechanics industry.

In the mid-1980’s, he began his path in the banking sector. Within the management of Banco Comercial Português, he was responsible for setting up financial operations in the primary market, for the listing process of the Stock Exchange, for the study and design of new financial products and also for part of the human resources’ training in the Capital Markets area.

Since January 2014, he had resumed his activity at Millennium BCP, joining the Investment Committee of the Millennium Capitalization Fund, even though he is an independent and non-executive member.

He is Vice-President of the General Assembly of the Order of Chartered Accountants. He was also the financial director of the CIN paint factory, with special responsibility for the company’s relationship with the Capital Markets.

He held the positions of member of the Supervisory Board of Caixa Geral de Depósitos (CGD), of non-executive director of the company Metro do Porto and Chairman of 32 Senses SGPS.

After having interrupted his activity as an economist during the period in which he was professionally active in politics, in March 2014 he took on positions at Boyden - Executive Search and at Neves de Almeida | HR Consulting, companies in the area of human resources management.

He was President of the general meeting of the Northern Regional Section Bureau of the Order of Economists.

He published Política In Situ (2002) and Analysis of the Regional Distribution of Public Investment (Análise à Distribuição Regional do Investimento Público) (1999), with articles published in the newspapers O Comércio do Porto, Público and Diário Económico. He was distinguished with the Marketing Cities and Regions Personality Award in 2004 and, in 2005, with the Alfredo César Torres Award. In 2012, he won the Career Award from the Faculty of Economics of Porto.

In 2014, his biography entitled Rui Rio - de Corpo Inteiro by Mário Jorge de Carvalho was published.  A year later, in 2015, the book Rui Rio - Raizes de Aço, authored by Carlos Mota Cardoso was published.

Political career
Rio began his political career as part of the Juventude Social-Democrata (JSD), the Social Democrats' youth organization. He was Vice President of its National Political Commission from 1982 to 1984. At the same time he was a member of the National Political Commission of the Social Democratic Party, under Pinto Balsemão and later Mota Pinto. He was also deputy to the Assembly of the Republic, elected for the Porto district, between 1991 and 2001. He was, during this period. From 2002 to 2005, he was vice-president, under leaders Durão Barroso and, subsequently, Pedro Santana Lopes. Repeating the position, between 2008 and 2010, with Manuela Ferreira Leite. Between 1996 and 1998, he was Vice President of the Instituto Sá Carneiro. From 2003 to 2005 he was President of the Eixo Atlântico do Noroeste Peninsular.

Mayor of Porto, 2001–2013
In 2001, Rio was elected president of the City Hall of Porto. After 2001, Rio was reelected Mayor of Porto, with absolute majority in 2005, against Francisco Assis, and in 2009, against Elisa Ferreira. His third and final term ended on the 22 October of 2013, having been, to date, the mayor who, in the history, has longest presided its destinies. He was president of the Eixo Atlântico do Noroeste Peninsular, between 2003 and 2005. His term ended on 22 October 2013, when the new mayor Rui Moreira took office.

Leader of the PSD, 2018–2022
In 2018, Rio won the race to become leader of the PSD after campaigning to hold the party on a centrist line. On the leadership election held on 13 February 2018, Rio defeated his more conservative rival, former Prime Minister Pedro Santana Lopes, winning 54 percent of votes from PSD party members.

Ending the animosity that followed the 2015 legislative election and nudging the PSD closer to the center, Rio and Prime Minister António Costa signed an agreement in April 2018 which covered cooperation on a reform intended to give more powers to municipalities, as well as on a 12-year strategy to keep using European Union structural funds for development. Under his leadership, the PSD also backed the Socialists in areas such as labor law reform and defense.

Amid criticism at his leadership, Rio won a confidence motion by 75 to 50 votes in the party's National Council in early 2019, only after a 10-hour debate. In January 2020, Rio fended off another leadership challenge on a promise to keep the leading opposition force on a centrist course. In the party's 2020 leadership election, he scored 53 percent in a runoff vote against the party's former parliamentary spokesman Luís Montenegro, who demanded a more aggressive opposition to António Costa's Socialist Party following the Social Democrats' worst result in over 30 years in the parliamentary elections the previous October.

On 27 November, 2021, he was re-elected President of the PSD for the third time, winning 18,852 votes, against Paulo Rangel, who collected 17,106 votes. He took office on 17 December, 2021, at the 39th National Congress of the Party, which took place in Santa Maria da Feira, under the motto "New Horizons for Portugal".

In the 2022 Portuguese legislative election, the Social Democrats lost 2 seats, taking them to 77 seats in the Assembly. In the aftermath of the election, Rio announced he would call early internal elections on which he would not run again for party leader.

On 28 May 2022, the day Luís Montenegro was elected leader of the Social Democratic Party, Rui Rio announced his departure from active politics.

On 12 September 2022, Rui Rio resigned his Assembly of the Republic seat, which became effective two days later.

Political positions
Rio was a critic of austerity and has sought to distance himself from the remedies adopted by Pedro Passos Coelho and the European troika in response to the eurozone economic crisis and the Economic Adjustment Programme for Portugal. On social issues, as a centrist, he is to the left of his party as a supporter of abortion rights, euthanasia and legalizing cannabis for medicinal purposes.

Criticism of Freemasonry 
Following his party's internal elections, which he disputed against Luís Montenegro and Miguel Pinto Luz, Rio stated that Freemasonry "is everywhere" and trying to "condition Portuguese society" by giving this organization obscure and untransparent motivations. Rio's statements were a response to Paulo Mota Pinto, who referred to Rio for further clarification on the alleged "dark interests" who want to dominate the party. Rio made statements in January 2019 regarding Montenegro's Freemansonry ties.

Rio admitted to perceiving Paulo Mota Pinto's reference and replied: "When I am talking about secret, obscure, little transparent interests, I am referring clearly to Freemasonry." He further went on saying that he "senses" that the Freemasons "are everywhere and trying to condition many things", and that he has "no doubt about that". Rio clarified that if he denied such influences he would be a "hypocrite" and that he is the only one with enough courage to criticize the Freemasons' influence.

Honours
 Grand-Cross of the Order of Prince Henry, Portugal (1 March 2006)
 Grand-Cross of the Order of Merit of the Republic of Hungary, Hungary (10 December 2003)
 First Class of the Order of the White Star, Estonia (20 February 2006)
 Grand-Cross of the Royal Norwegian Order of Merit, Norway (25 September 2009)
 Grand-Cross of the Order of St. Gregory the Great, Holy See (3 September 2010)
 Commander of the Order of Merit of the Republic of Poland, Poland (16 July 2012)

Electoral history
PSD leadership election, 2018

|- style="background-color:#E9E9E9"
! align="center" colspan=2 style="width:  60px"|Candidate
! align="center" style="width:  50px"|Votes
! align="center" style="width:  50px"|%
|-
|bgcolor=orange|
| align=left | Rui Rio
| align=right | 22,728
| align=right | 54.2
|-
|bgcolor=orange|
| align=left | Pedro Santana Lopes
| align=right | 19,244
| align=right | 45.8
|-
| colspan=2 align=left | Blank/Invalid ballots
| align=right | 683
| align=right | –
|-
|- style="background-color:#E9E9E9"
| colspan=2 style="text-align:left;" |   Turnout
| align=right | 42,655
| align=right | 60.34
|-
| colspan="4" align=left|Source: Official results
|}

PSD leadership election, 2020

|- style="background-color:#E9E9E9"
! align="center" rowspan=2 colspan=2 style="width:  60px"|Candidate
! align="center" colspan=2 style="width:  50px"|1st round
! align="center" colspan=2 style="width:  50px"|2nd round
|-
! align="center" style="width:  50px"|Votes
! align="center" style="width:  50px"|%
! align="center" style="width:  50px"|Votes
! align="center" style="width:  50px"|%
|-
|bgcolor=orange|
| align=left | Rui Rio
| align=right | 15,546
| align=right | 49.0
| align=right | 17,157
| align=right | 53.2
|-
|bgcolor=orange|
| align=left | Luís Montenegro
| align=right | 13,137
| align=right | 41.4
| align=right | 15,086
| align=right | 46.8
|-
|bgcolor=orange|
| align=left | Miguel Pinto Luz
| align=right | 3,030
| align=right | 9.6
|colspan="2"| 
|-
| colspan=2 align=left | Blank/Invalid ballots
| align=right | 369
| align=right | –
| align=right | 341
| align=right | –
|-
|- style="background-color:#E9E9E9"
| colspan=2 style="text-align:left;" |   Turnout
| align=right | 32,082
| align=right | 79.01
| align=right | 32,582
| align=right | 80.20
|-
| colspan="6" align=left|Source: Official results
|}

PSD leadership election, 2021

|- style="background-color:#E9E9E9"
! align="center" colspan=2 style="width:  60px"|Candidate
! align="center" style="width:  50px"|Votes
! align="center" style="width:  50px"|%
|-
|bgcolor=orange|
| align=left | Rui Rio
| align=right | 18,852
| align=right | 52.4
|-
|bgcolor=orange|
| align=left | Paulo Rangel
| align=right | 17,106
| align=right | 47.6
|-
| colspan=2 align=left | Blank/Invalid ballots
| align=right | 518
| align=right | –
|-
|- style="background-color:#E9E9E9"
| colspan=2 style="text-align:left;" |   Turnout
| align=right | 36,476
| align=right | 78.17
|-
| colspan="4" align=left|Source: Official results
|}

See also
 Porto history and timeline

References

External links
Profile on website of the Assembly of the Republic

Living people
1957 births
Social Democratic Party (Portugal) politicians
Mayors of Porto
Members of the Assembly of the Republic (Portugal)
University of Porto alumni
People from Porto
Recipients of the Order of the White Star, 1st Class
Grand Crosses of the Order of Prince Henry
Grand Crosses of the Order of Merit of the Republic of Hungary (civil)
Knights Grand Cross of the Order of St Gregory the Great
Grand Crosses of the Order of Merit of the Republic of Poland